Johan Robeck (1672–1739) was a Swedish-German philosopher who wrote an essay allowing suicide from a theological point of view. His essay started a debate among Europeans of his time, especially after he himself committed suicide by drowning in the river Weser near Bremen, Germany.

Robeck's argument is based upon the idea of life as a gift, given by God, who therefore gave up for his rights in the gift. Anyone can destroy a gift, according to Robeck's argument; therefore, suicide is legitimate.

In Candide
Robeck's suicide is referenced in the old woman's story at the end of chapter XII in Voltaire's 1759 novel Candide, "...but I have met only twelve who have voluntarily put an end to their misery—three negroes, four Englishmen, four Swiss, and a German professor called Robeck." The Penguin Classics edition of Candide features an introduction by Michael Wood, who explains that "Robeck was a historical person who argued that loving life was ridiculous and sought to prove his point by drowning himself in 1739".

Notes

Sources
J.J. Rousseau, Nouvelle Eloise, III, 21.

1672 births
1735 deaths
German philosophers
German male writers
18th-century suicides
Suicides by drowning in Germany